Ryan Dungey (born December 4, 1989) is an American professional motocross and supercross racer. He competed in the AMA Motocross Championships from 2006 to 2017 and again in 2022. Dungey is notable for being a four-time supercross and four-time (1-250, 3-450) motocross national champion.

Dungey has won every major title in American motocross and supercross. He is coming out of retirement to race the first two rounds of the Lucas Oil pro motocross championship in 2022. He won the world's largest international motocross race, the Motocross des Nations three times. He has seven major AMA championships. Dungey is tied for sixth place in all-time 450 Supercross race wins (33) and sixth place in all-time Supercross combined wins (44). He holds the record for consecutive podium finishes in Supercross at 31. In all-time 450 motocross overall wins, Dungey is second with 39 to Ricky Carmichael and ahead of Bob Hannah. He is third place in all-time combined (250/450) motocross overall wins (46). Finally, he is in fourth place in all-time combined Supercross and Motocross wins with 80 total race wins.

As of April 29, 2022, Dungey announced his return from retirement, and that comes with information that he will be racing the first 2 round of the Lucas Oil Pro Motocross Championship, alongside his 9x MX World Champion, Antonio Cairoli.
For the 2023 season, Ryan will put an end on his career as he doesn't want to compete on the full season.

Early life
Ryan Dungey was born in 1989 to Troy and Michelle Dungey in Belle Plaine, Minnesota. He has one older brother, Jade and one younger brother, Blake. Dungey's brothers and father were amateur racers as well. Dungey, who attended Guardian Angels Catholic School in Chaska, Minnesota, routinely expresses his Christian faith in interviews.

In 2006, at the age of 16, Dungey auditioned for and was signed to a pro contract.

Season results

Amateur
As an amateur Dungey did not shine in the mini classes. Once on the full size bikes he started to improve to the point of winning races. Dungey capped his amateur career by winning the 2005 Loretta Lynn's Amateur Championship and was expected to repeat the following year.

2006
Ryan Dungey began the year in the amateur 250cc ranks. Despite being a "B" rider and generating mostly 10th-place finishes he attracted the attention of Suzuki team manager Roger De Coster. Dungey entered his first professional race at his home track of Spring Creek in Millville, Minnesota. Dungey, number 142 on his plate, finished an impressive 8th in Moto 1 and 8th in Moto 2 for a 7th in the overall at one of the muddiest outdoor nationals on record. Dungey would show that this result was no fluke finishing with 13-13 results for 15th in the overall the next week in Broome-Tioga, NY. Dungey did struggle the last 4 rounds, only finishing above 20th place 2 times in the final 4 motos. He finished with 50 Points total and 28th in the overall 250 MX standings.

2007
His first full year in the professional ranks started in the 250 East Supercross. No one expected much from the No. 62 factory Suzuki rider, and it wouldn't be the first time he would be underestimated. Right out of the gate, Dungey schooled the field and won his first-ever professional Supercross race. He would struggle the rest of the Supercross season, either winning or going down trying. He bounced back at Round 5 with his second career win. He finished third in round 6 and won the final round of the Supercross East series for fifth overall. At the season finale Dave Coombs East–West Shootout in Las Vegas Ryan won by 4.7 seconds over second-place Jake Weimer. Ryan was named 2007 Supercross rookie of the year.

In his first full season of AMA Motocross, Dungey would place 3–3 in Round 1 for his first professional career podium. Showing his consistency, Ryan would place a 4–4 in round 2, 3–3 in round 3 and 5–4 in round 4 and wind up on the podium a total of 4 times. Despite leaving the series due to an injury, he finished fifth for the season.

2008
Dungey was expected to win the 2008 Supercross West title in his second pro season. Throughout the early half he built a sizeable points lead, but by mid-season his advantage had dwindled and dropped to a two-point deficit behind his rival, Jason Lawrence who took the championship.

2009
In his final year in the 250 class he dominated the 250 West Supercross while battling Kawasaki’s Christophe Pourcel for the AMA Motocross Championship. The US was not expected to be competitive in the 2009 Motocross des Nations due to A-list riders James Stewart and Ryan Villopoto being out with injuries. Dungey, having never raced a 450cc bike was nominated as team captain and entered the premier MX1 (450) class. In a contest that came down to a battle between the US, powerful French and host Italian teams, Dungey took 1st in the final moto and secured the USA’s 20th MXoN victory.

2010
Ryan Dungey was predicted to have a modest rookie season in 450 Supercross. James Stewart was the heavy favorite coming off of his second Championship. Dungey started off strong leading most of the first season race until James made a pass with 2 laps to go. Dungey battled back and almost made a last lap pass. He came back strong with 2 straight wins in rounds 2 and 3. Dungey went on to win six races that season and become the first rider since Jeremy McGrath to win the Supercross Championship as a rookie.

Dungey had a slow start at Hangtown, the first race of the outdoor Motocross season. At the 2nd round he bounced back and won both motos. Dungey won 10 out of the final 11 rounds and captured his first AMA Motocross 450 Championship. Through a combined 29 rounds of AMA Supercross and Motocross, he won more than half of the races and became the only rider to capture both the Supercross and Motocross titles in his rookie year. Dungey led the US team to its 21st victory in the 2010 MXoN.

2011
In 2011, Ryan's mentor, Roger De Coster left team Suzuki and the effect on Ryan was obvious. He still came in a respectable 3rd in the Supercross season behind Ryan Villopoto and Chad Reed, but word of a team change was going around.

Ryan came in to the 2011 outdoor season bearing the number one plate. At the first round he did battle with both Chad Reed and Ryan Villopoto taking 2nd overall with a 1-2 moto finish to Chads 2-1. Villopoto was 3rd at 3-3.  At round 2 he placed a strong 2nd in the first moto only to suffer a bike malfunction and a DNF in moto 2 for an 8th overall. At round 10 Dungey won the first moto but missed the start of moto 2 due to another malfunction of his 450 Suzuki, finally getting onto the track a minute behind the pack. He battled back to a 7th-place finish by the end of the moto, salvaging a 3rd-place finish for the day. He finished the season 2nd only 12 points behind Villopoto. Dungey led the US team to its 22nd and 3rd consecutive victory in the 2011 MXoN.

2012
Dungey joined De Coster at KTM and they literally built a production bike to his liking for the 2012 AMA Supercross. Dungey took 1st in four of the Supercross events. He raced round 9 with a cracked collar bone but missed rounds 10 thru 14 after surgery and wound up 3rd for the season.

Dungey put in a stellar performance in the outdoor MX. After placing 2nd to James Stewart in rounds 1 and 2, he finished the season with wins in 19 of the final 20 motos and 10 overall wins, earning his second outdoor title in the 450 class with two rounds remaining in the season. It was KTMs first title in the USA.

2013
Though not his best year, Dungey would stand on the podium in 23 of the seasons 29 races foreshadowing the moniker "Diesel" due to the consistency of his performances. He finished 3rd behind Villopoto and Davi Millsaps in Supercross and 2nd behind Villopoto at the outdoors.

2014
Continuing 2014 as the most consistent rider in the class, Dungey wound up on the podium 21 out of 29 times. Round 16 of the 2014 Supercross would be the last time Dungey would finish outside the top 5 for the rest of his career. He finishing 2nd to Ryan Villopoto in Supercross and 2nd, 14 points behind Ken Roczen in Motocross.

2015
The 2015 season was vintage Dungey, showing his diesel consistency and adding incredible speed, clicking off ride after flawless ride. Dungey’s newfound energy on the track produced stellar results. Fifteen total wins and 21 straight podiums in both the AMA Supercross and Motocross put the No. 1 back on his KTM. After the only 5th-place finish of the year at round 6 of the outdoor, Dungey would reeled off another 21 straight podiums carrying over into the 2016 season.

2016
Dungey would set a record in the 2016 Supercross with 31 consecutive podium finishes over the combined 2015-2016 seasons. He won the Supercross championship.

2017
2017 marked his most hard fought battle ever against the super-fast Eli Tomac. With only three wins on the season to Tomac’s nine, Dungey once again used consistency to take the title. Dungey took the championship at the season finale by 5 points in one of the best Supercross races of all time. Immediately after taking the title he announced his retirement.

2022
On the 29th of April, Red Bull KTM Factoy racing and Ryan Dungey announced a comeback for Dungey to race rounds 1 & 2 of the 2022 AMA Pro Motorcross championship. He ended up racing the full 12 rounds, where he managed a solid 6th, in the overall point standings.

Career AMA Supercross/Motocross results

Championships

2009 AMA West Coast SX Lites Champion
2009 AMA 250 Motocross Champion
2009 Motocross des Nations Champion
2010 AMA Supercross 450 Champion (Rookie Season)
2010 AMA 450 Motocross Champion (Rookie Season)
2010 Motocross des Nations Champion (Team USA)

2011 Motocross des Nations Champion (Team USA)
2012 AMA 450 Motocross Champion
2015 AMA Supercross 450 Champion
2015 AMA 450 Motocross Champion
2016 AMA Supercross 450 Champion
2017 AMA Supercross 450 Champion

Total career AMA wins
10 in SX Lites Supercross Class
7 in 250 Motocross Class  3-2008 4-2009
34 in 450 Supercross Class   6-2010 1-2011 4-2012 2-2013 1-2014 8-2015 9-2016 3-2017 (6th all-time)
39 in 450 Motocross Class 10-2010 4-2011 10-2012 3-2013 4-2014 7-2015 1-2016
80 AMA total wins (4th all-time) 3-2008 4-2009 16-2010 5-2011 14-2012 5-2013 5-2014 15-2015 10-2016 3-2017

Podium finishes
31 consecutive 2015 and 2016 Supercross (record)
54 of 58 2014 MX thru 2016 SX seasons
From 2009 to 2017 finished only 2 races outside of the top 10

Other accomplishments
2015 ESPY Award for Best Male Action Sports Athlete
2016 First Motocross Rider on Wheaties Box
2016 ESPY Award for Best Male Action Sports Athlete

Personal life

Dungey became a Global Envoy for Livestrong after losing his grandmother to cancer in 2005. After working with Target stores in 2012 and 2013, he organized the MN River-to-River Ride to benefit St. Jude Children's Research Hospital.

Notes

References

External links

http://www.racerxonline.com/rider/ryan-dungey

1989 births
Living people
American motocross riders
AMA Motocross Championship National Champions
People from Belle Plaine, Minnesota